Johann Jakob Merlo (25 October 1810 – 27 October 1890) was a German historian, antiquarian and poet.

References
Keussen, Hermann (1906), "Merlot, Johann Jakob", Allgemeine Deutsche Biographie (in German) 52, Leipzig: Duncker & Humblot, p. 329.

External links
 
Johann Jakob Merlo on the German-language Wikisource

1810 births
1890 deaths
Writers from Cologne
German poets
German antiquarians
19th-century German historians
19th-century German writers
19th-century German male writers